Darkhazineh (also Romanized as Darkhazīneh and Dar-i-Khazineh) is a village in Shahid Modarres Rural District, in the Central District of Shushtar County, Khuzestan Province, Iran. At the 2006 census, its population was 459, living in 96 families.

References 

Populated places in Shushtar County